Tropical Storm Arthur was the first Atlantic tropical storm that formed during the month of May since 1981. The first tropical cyclone of the 2008 Atlantic hurricane season, the storm formed on May 30, 2008 from the interaction of two tropical waves and the remnants of the eastern Pacific Tropical Storm Alma, which had crossed into the western Caribbean Sea. The system quickly organized and was named Tropical Storm Arthur on May 31, while crossing the shore of Belize. It dissipated two days later over the Yucatán Peninsula in Mexico. Arthur and its remnants triggered severe flooding which killed a reported nine people and affected 100,000 more in Belize. Damage was light to moderate, estimated at $78 million (2008 USD).

Meteorological history

By May 29, 2008, the western Caribbean Sea became tropically active due to the presence of two tropical waves and Tropical Storm Alma, which was located in the east Pacific Ocean. The system generated a broad surface low pressure system, as well as clusters of atmospheric convection. The next day, Alma made landfall on Nicaragua, pulling deep tropical moisture into the region. Upper level outflow was spreading outwards from the tropical storm with a high pressure system over the Caribbean. A surface trough developed and extended from inland Honduras to just south of the Cayman Islands, which sparked further development of strong convection. Later that day, the remnants of Alma merged with another tropical wave in the western Caribbean, which sparked the development of a new surface low.

On May 31, the remnants of Alma were situated along the coast of Belize as a 1004 mbar low-pressure system. A broad upper-level ridge was anchored over the Gulf of Honduras, which covered the entire region and maintained deep tropical moisture. Satellite imagery and a NOAA buoy reported sustained tropical storm-force winds. In post-analysis, it was determined that Arthur had developed more than 12 hours earlier, late on May 30, and made landfall early on May 31 with 45 mph (75 km/h) winds in northeastern Belize. While over land, Arthur maintained minimal tropical storm force winds, concentrated primarily over open waters to the east and northeast. Despite being over land for several hours, the storm maintained a fairly organized structure. The storm contained a large low-level center, accompanied by convective banding, and was developing new convective cells. Initially, it was thought Arthur would continue generally westward due to a ridge to its north, and later re-intensify in the Bay of Campeche.

The associated thunderstorm activity became separated from the center of circulation, and early on June 1, the center became difficult to locate due to becoming disorganized. It remained a tropical storm over land for nearly 24 hours before weakening to a tropical depression later that day. While drifting southwestward over land, Arthur weakened further, and the National Hurricane Center issued its last advisory on the system late on June 1. By June 4, the remnants of Arthur were diminishing over southeastern Mexico without any redevelopment. Thunderstorms briefly redeveloped two days later, as its associated circulation crossed over the Bay of Campeche into Veracruz, although it dissipated soon after.

Impact and records

In preparation for the storm, ports were closed in the Mexican state of Quintana Roo, while residents and tourists were encouraged to take precautions in coastal areas. Also, ports were closed on the islands of Cozumel, Isla Mujeres and in Chetumal. Small boats were restricted from leaving some ports, but evacuations were deemed unnecessary. Tropical storm warnings were issued as soon as the storm was first classified for the coast of Belize and the coast of Mexico south of Cabo Catoche, and remained in effect until Arthur weakened to a tropical depression.

The storm produced rainfall as far south as Belize City and kicked up strong surf on the island of Ambergris Caye. Winds from Arthur forced the closure of two of Mexico's three main oil exporting ports in the Gulf of Mexico due to rough seas. The storm's remnants, combined with recent heavy rains from Tropical Storm Alma, triggered flash flooding and caused rivers in southern and northern Belize to overflow. The flooding damaged one bridge and one highway, and several other bridges were under water. One village was evacuated, and shelters in Corozal and Orange Walk were opened. In rural areas the electricity was cut off due to safety issues. Dozens were stranded on their roof due to high water, and work to repair an important highway was halted when flood waters washed away the repaired section. Papaya plantations, shrimp farms and rice crops were also affected by the unsettled weather. 

In all, about 100,000 people were affected by the flooding, and nine fatalities were reported; five of which were directly attributed to Arthur. A total of 714 houses were damaged, and damage in Belize was estimated at $78 million (2008 USD). British helicopters helped rescue stranded people following the storm, and Mexico provided a helicopter to help carry supplies to areas affected by the flooding. Prime Minister Dean Barrow declared a disaster area in southern Belize's Stann Creek Valley. Additionally, the government rushed food, water and clothing to about 13,000 people. 

When Arthur later moved over Mexico, it dropped heavy rainfall, with a maximum 24-hour total of 8.34 in (212 mm) in Pijijiapan, Chiapas. There were no reports of damage or deaths in the country. 
Arthur was the first tropical storm to form in May in the Atlantic since Tropical Storm Arlene in 1981, and the last until Tropical Storm Alberto in May 2012.

See also

Other tropical cyclones named Arthur
 Timeline of the 2008 Atlantic hurricane season
 List of off-season Atlantic hurricanes
 Tropical Storm Cristobal (2020)

References

2008 Atlantic hurricane season
Atlantic tropical storms
Tropical Storm Arthur
Off-season Atlantic tropical cyclones
Arthur